Roberto Pérez (born 17 April 1960) is a Bolivian footballer. He played in 16 matches for the Bolivia national football team from 1983 to 1993. He was also part of Bolivia's squad for the 1983 Copa América tournament.

References

1960 births
Living people
Bolivian footballers
Bolivia international footballers
Place of birth missing (living people)
Association football defenders